Rhosydd Castell-du & Plas-y-bettws is an area of fen-meadow and grassland that is a Site of Special Scientific Interest in Carmarthen & Dinefwr,  Wales.

See also
List of Sites of Special Scientific Interest in Carmarthen & Dinefwr

References

Sites of Special Scientific Interest in Carmarthen & Dinefwr